A Japanese variety show is an entertainment television program made up of a variety of original stunts, musical performances, comedy skits, quiz contests, and other acts. Japanese variety shows are predominantly made to be weird and extremely fast-paced for entertainment purposes and are primarily scheduled during prime television time. They usually feature a variety of tarento hosts, presenters and guests that include, but are not limited to celebrities, comedians, J-pop Idols, and so on.

History
Japanese variety shows have been around since the 1950s. From playing larger-than-life games to performing extreme stunts, and involving everything from eating unusual foods to competing in trivia competitions with consequences for the losers, the concentrated appeal of such variety shows generally expanded with time to more directly involve guests in competitive scenarios.

The second longest-running Japanese television show, which is a comedy, is Shōten which began running in 1966 on Nippon TV. Television in Japan made a big impact in the 1930s but then was put to a halt because of WWII. After WWII NHK and Nippon television were able to start up again around 1953. One of the first shows to have started on Nippon TV was Downtown no Gaki no Tsukai ya Arahende!!, which started in 1989 and is still running to this day with 1378 episodes as of Oct 29, 2017.

Current situation
Japanese television programs such as Music Station and Utaban (cancelled 2010) continue in an almost pristine format from the same variety shows of years before. The only major changes have been the increasing disappearance of live backup music since the 1980s. Variety game shows such as Nazotoki Batoru Tore! and Team Fight often featured regular celebrity guests as well as special guest appearances to tie in with forthcoming musical, cinematic and publishing releases; this - a frequent feature of primetime Japanese variety television - has remained consistent over the years.

A once-popular host Kyosen Ōhashi said, "Weird shows that are called Variety only exists in Japan."

One of the more well-circulated clips is a segment in Gaki no Tsukai, hosted by the comedy duo Downtown. In one part, if the male contestants fail to say a tongue-twister correctly, they get hit in the crotch by a spring-loaded pole (The Chinko Machine, or, literally, the Penis Machine), causing great pain. Hitoshi Matsumoto attempted to withdraw but the host - his comedy partner and co-host Masatoshi Hamada, cajoled him back on the platform.

Controversy regarding game shows
Japanese game shows have been known for including very cruel challenges, with Hollywood Reporter stating in 2008 "the Japanese have elevated cruelty to an art form." In 2002, it was acknowledged that these game show challenges had caused physical injuries to some contestants. Some of these Japanese game show injuries even included spinal injuries. In 2014, Japanese game shows were still acknowledged for having cruel challenges under the guise of comedy. In the United States of America in December 1994, Saturday Night Live mocked these unique forms of game shows with a sketch called Quiz Kings. They were also mocked in a May 1999 episode of The Simpsons called Thirty Minutes Over Tokyo.

Influences overseas
Japanese game shows have gained popularity around the world in recent years. A notable example is Hole in the Wall, or Brain Wall, which has had local versions in Russia, China, Argentina, Australia, America and Britain. The latter two are the most successful versions, with the FOX network and Cartoon Network each having decent success with US versions of the format. The BBC would also find success with their own version in the UK.

With foreign game shows gaining interest from American viewers, in 2008, ABC would create and broadcast two game shows that took influence from Japanese game shows. The first of which was Wipeout, a weekly competition show that involved contestants playing in a large obstacle course. The other was I Survived a Japanese Game Show, which was a reality show that used a fictional Japanese game show to eliminate contestants one by one until the last player standing won a grand prize. Due to the similarities between their shows and other Japanese programs, ABC has been sued by TBS (Tokyo Broadcasting System) for allegedly copying Sasuke and Takeshi's Castle.

See also
Variety show
Manzai
I Survived a Japanese Game Show
Japanizi: Going, Going, Gong!
Takeshi's Castle
Brain Wall
Gaki no Tsukai ya Arahende
Za Gaman

References

Television genres
Variety shows
Japanese entertainment terms
Japanese game shows